Lukić is a Serbo-Croatian surname, a patronymic and diminutive of Luka. It may refer to:

Andrej Lukić (born 1994), Croatian footballer
Dragan Lukić (1928–2006), Serbian children's writer
Dragan Lukić Lvky (born c. 1970), Croatian singer, songwriter and music producer
Ilija Lukić, (1942–2018), Serbian football player
John Lukic (born 1960), English former football goalkeeper
Mihajlo Lukić (1886–1961), Croatian general
Milan Lukić (born 1967), Bosnian Serb warlord
Radomir Lukić (1914–1999), Serbian legal scholar of philosophy
Saša Lukić (born 1996), Serbian footballer for Italian serie A club Torino
Slavko Lukić (born 1989), Serbian footballer
Srđan Lukić (born 1981), Serbian footballer
Sreten Lukić (born 1955), Serbian  politician and convicted war criminal
Stojan Lukić (born 1979), Swedish footballer
Tatjana Lukić (1959–2008), Croatian-born Australian poetry editor and poet
Vitomir Lukić (1929–1991), Bosnian-Croat prose writer and pedagogue
Vladan Lukić (born 1970), former Yugoslavia international football player from Serbia
Vojislava Lukić (born 1987), professional Serbian tennis player
Živko Lukić (1944–2015), Serbian football player

See also
Lučić

Croatian surnames
Serbian surnames
Slavic-language surnames
Patronymic surnames

de:Lukić
ru:Лукич